Josep Martínez Riera (born 27 May 1998) is a Spanish professional footballer who plays as a goalkeeper for  club Genoa, on loan from RB Leipzig. He also plays for the Spain national team.

Club career

Las Palmas
Born in Alzira, Valencia, Martínez joined FC Barcelona's La Masia in July 2015, from hometown's UD Alzira. On 19 July 2017, after finishing his formation, he signed for UD Las Palmas and was assigned to the reserves in Segunda División B.

Martínez made his senior debut on 20 August 2017, starting in a 1–1 home draw against UD Melilla. He finished the campaign as a starter, as his side avoided relegation.

Martínez made his first team debut on 28 April 2019, playing the full 90 minutes of a 4–1 home routing of CD Lugo in the Segunda División championship. On 17 June, he was definitely promoted to the main squad.

RB Leipzig
On 22 January 2020, RB Leipzig reached an agreement with Las Palmas for the transfer of Martínez, effective as of 1 July. He agreed to a contract until 2024 with his new club.

Loan to Genoa
On 29 June 2022, Martínez was loaned to Genoa in Italy for the 2022–23 season.

International career
Due to the isolation of some national team players following the positive COVID-19 test of Sergio Busquets, Spain's under-21 squad were called up for the international friendly against Lithuania on 8 June 2021. Martínez made his senior debut in the match.

Career statistics

International

Honours
RB Leipzig
 DFB-Pokal: 2021–22

References

External links

1998 births
Living people
People from Alzira, Valencia
Sportspeople from the Province of Valencia
Spanish footballers
Footballers from the Valencian Community
Association football goalkeepers
Segunda División players
Segunda División B players
Bundesliga players
Serie B players
UD Las Palmas Atlético players
UD Las Palmas players
RB Leipzig players
Genoa C.F.C. players
Spain under-21 international footballers
Spain international footballers
Spanish expatriate footballers
Spanish expatriate sportspeople in Germany
Expatriate footballers in Germany
Spanish expatriate sportspeople in Italy
Expatriate footballers in Italy